Recuerdos, Vol. II is the nineteenth studio album by Juan Gabriel, released in 1984. With sales of over 8 million copies, it is the best-selling album of all time in Mexico. It received a nomination for a Grammy Award for Best Mexican-American performance in 1985.

Track listing
'

See also
List of best-selling Latin albums

References

External links

Juan Gabriel albums
1984 albums